Associação Naval 1º de Maio or Associação Naval 1893, commonly known as Naval, is a Portuguese football club based in Figueira da Foz, Coimbra District. Founded on 1 May 1893, it plays in the Division of Honour in the Coimbra Football Association, holding home games at the Estádio Municipal José Bento Pessoa, with a capacity of 12,630 spectators. The club spent six seasons between 2005 and 2011 in the first division, the Primeira Liga.

Naval is one of the main teams from the Centro Region, alongside Académica de Coimbra, S.C. Beira-Mar, União de Leiria and União de Coimbra.

History
After several years in the second division, Naval first promoted to the first level in 2005, after finishing in second position behind F.C. Paços de Ferreira. In its first season in the top flight, the club finished in 13th position, finally moving up to 12th after the resolutions on the "Mateus Affair", which involved Gil Vicente F.C. and C.F. Os Belenenses.

In the following three years, Naval ranked between places 11–13, also reaching the Taça de Portugal quarter-finals twice. In 2009–10, former Sporting CP, FC Porto and Portugal national team great Augusto Inácio led the Figueira da Foz team to its best season ever, an eight-place finish in the league and the semi-finals of the domestic cup, a 1–3 aggregate loss against G.D. Chaves.

Naval returned to division two at the end of the 2010–11 season, after two coaching changes. Highlights included a 2–1 home win against S.L. Benfica and a 3–3 draw at Sporting CP. In April 2013, the club were deducted 12 points by order of world football governing body FIFA, due to outstanding debts to two teams in Brazil; another relegation followed.

Due to legal solutions, the clube was forced to change its name to Associação Naval 1893. Currently plays in the Honor Division (Coimbra Football Association).

Last playing squad

League and cup history

Managers
 Ulisses Morais (1995–97, 2007–09)
 Guto Ferreira (2003)
 Toni (2003–04)
 Rogério Gonçalves (2004–05, 2006, 2010)
 Manuel Cajuda (2005)
 Álvaro Magalhães (2005–06)
 Mariano Barreto (2006–07)
 Francisco Chaló (2007)
 Augusto Inácio (2009–10)
 Victor Zvunka (2010)
 Carlos Mozer (2011)

References

External links
Official website 

 
Naval
Association football clubs established in 1893
1893 establishments in Portugal
Association football clubs disestablished in 2017
Primeira Liga clubs
Liga Portugal 2 clubs